The Łosice transmitter is a facility for television and FM radio transmission sited at Chotycze in Łosice County, Poland. It uses a 313-metre-high guyed mast. The task of the transmitter is the signal coverage of the two largest cities in the region - Biala Podlaska and Siedlce. Approximate distance between both cities and the transmitter in straight line: 30 km.

Programmes transmitted

Television (DVB-T MPEG4 and DVB-T2 HEVC)

FM radio

External links
 http://emi.emitel.pl/EMITEL/obiekty.aspx?obiekt=DODR_E1G
 http://www.skyscraperpage.com/diagrams/?b46547

See also
 List of masts

References

Buildings and structures in Masovian Voivodeship
Communications in Poland
Łosice County
Towers in Poland